Zaborze  is a village in the administrative district of Gmina Oświęcim, within Oświęcim County, Lesser Poland Voivodeship, in southern Poland.

The village has a population of 2,464.

References

Villages in Oświęcim County